Moselopterus is a genus of prehistoric eurypterid from the Devonian period in Europe. The genus contains three species, M. ancylotelson and M. elongatus from Germany and M. lancmani from Latvia.

See also
 List of eurypterids

References

Eurypterina
Devonian eurypterids
Devonian arthropods of Europe
Eurypterids of Europe